Mohamed Katana Nyanje (born 24 December 1999) is a Kenyan professional footballer who plays for Vasalund. Besides Kenya, he has played in Portugal and Belarus.

International career
Katana was called up to Kenya national football team for a friendly match against Zambia in October 2020, but did not debut, spending the game on the bench.

References

External links 
 
 Player's profile at pressball.by

1999 births
Living people
Kenyan footballers
Kenyan expatriate footballers
Expatriate footballers in Portugal
Kenyan expatriate sportspeople in Portugal
Expatriate footballers in Belarus
Expatriate footballers in Sweden
Association football midfielders
Bandari F.C. (Kenya) players
FC Isloch Minsk Raion players
Vasalunds IF players